Mierendorffplatz is a station on the Berlin U-Bahn  line in Charlottenburg. It was opened on 1 October 1980 with the line's extension from Richard-Wagner-Platz to Rohrdamm. The eponymous square is named after politician and Resistance fighter Carlo Mierendorff (1897–1943).
Architect Rümmler designed this station walls like the pattern of a M as in Mierendorffplatz. The next station is Richard Wagner Platz.

References

External links

U7 (Berlin U-Bahn) stations
Buildings and structures in Charlottenburg-Wilmersdorf
Railway stations in Germany opened in 1980